"Prisoner of Society" is a song by Australian punk rock band the Living End. It was originally released in Australia on the 1997 EP Second Solution / Prisoner of Society. The song was later released as a single, separate from the EP, in the United States in January 1999. In January 2018, as part of Triple M's "Ozzest 100", "Prisoner of Society" was ranked number 32.

Background
The Living End had achieved mainstream success with the release of their third EP, Second Solution / Prisoner of Society, in September 1997. It peaked at  4 on the ARIA Singles Chart and spent 69 weeks within the ARIA Top 100. "Prisoner of Society" also reached No. 15 on Triple J's Hottest 100 for 1997.

In January 1999, "Prisoner of Society" was released as a radio single in the United States, where it peaked at No. 23 on the Billboard Modern Rock Tracks chart. Eight months later, it was released in the United Kingdom as a stand-alone single but did not reach the top 100.

Track listing

Recorded and engineered by Lindsay Gravina at Sing Sing Studios (Melbourne). Mixed by Jerry Finn at The Mastering Lab (Los Angeles).

Personnel
 Chris Cheney – guitar, vocals
 Scott Owen – upright bass, backing vocals
 Travis Demsey – drums, backing vocals

Charts

Weekly charts

Year-end charts

Certifications

Release history

References

External links
 Prisoner of Society music video

1998 songs
1999 singles
The Living End songs
Reprise Records singles
Songs written by Chris Cheney